Schmidtottia is a genus of flowering plants in the family Rubiaceae, native to eastern Cuba. Adapted to serpentine soils, they are nickel hyperaccumulators.

Species
Currently accepted species include:

Schmidtottia corymbosa Borhidi
Schmidtottia cubensis (Standl.) Urb.
Schmidtottia cucullata Borhidi
Schmidtottia elliptica (Britton) Urb.
Schmidtottia involucrata (Wernham) Alain
Schmidtottia marmorata Urb.
Schmidtottia monantha Urb.
Schmidtottia monticola Borhidi
Schmidtottia multiflora Urb.
Schmidtottia neglecta (Borhidi) Borhidi
Schmidtottia nitens (Britton) Urb.
Schmidtottia parvifolia Alain
Schmidtottia scabra Borhidi & Acuña
Schmidtottia sessilifolia (Britton) Urb.
Schmidtottia shaferi (Standl.) Urb.
Schmidtottia stricta Borhidi
Schmidtottia uliginosa (Wernham) Urb.

References

Chiococceae
Rubiaceae genera
Endemic flora of Cuba